Frogmore is an unincorporated community in Corcordia Parish, Louisiana, United States.

Notes

Unincorporated communities in Concordia Parish, Louisiana
Unincorporated communities in Louisiana